Peter Pan is a 1953 American animated adventure fantasy film produced in 1952 by Walt Disney Productions and released by RKO Radio Pictures. Based on J. M. Barrie's 1904 play Peter Pan, or the Boy Who Wouldn't Grow Up, it is the 14th Disney animated feature film. The film was directed by Hamilton Luske, Clyde Geronimi, and Wilfred Jackson. Featuring the voices of Bobby Driscoll, Kathryn Beaumont, Hans Conried, and Bill Thompson, the film's plot follows Wendy Darling and her two brothers, who meet the never-growing-up Peter Pan and travel with him to the island of Neverland to stay young, where they also have to face Peter's archenemy, Captain Hook.

In 1935, Walt Disney began considering plans to adapt Barrie's play into an animated feature. He purchased the film rights from Paramount Pictures in 1938, and began preliminary development in the next year. However, following the attack on Pearl Harbor, Disney shelved the project when his studio was contracted by the United States government to produce training and war propaganda films. The project sat idle in development for the rest of the decade until it experienced a turnaround in 1949. To assist the animators, live-action reference footage was shot with actors on soundstages. It also marked the last Disney film in which all nine members of Disney's Nine Old Men worked together as directing animators.

Peter Pan was released on February 5, 1953, becoming the final Disney animated feature released through RKO before Disney founded his own distribution company. The film was entered into the 1953 Cannes Film Festival, Upon its release, the film earned positive reviews from film critics and was a box office success. Its representation of the Native Americans received retrospective criticism. 

A sequel, titled Return to Never Land, was released in 2002, and a series of direct-to-DVD prequels focusing on Tinker Bell began in 2008. A live-action adaptation of the film is scheduled to be released on Disney+ in April 2023.

Plot

In Edwardian London, George and Mary Darling's preparations to attend a party are disrupted by the antics of their boys, John and Michael, who are acting out a Peter Pan story told them by their elder sister Wendy. An irritated George demands that Wendy drop the stories and move out of the nursery, since "sooner or later, people have to grow up". Later that night, Peter himself arrives in the nursery to find his lost shadow. He persuades Wendy to come to Neverland, where she will never have to grow up, and she and the boys fly there with the begrudging help of the pixie Tinker Bell.

A ship of pirates is anchored off Neverland, led by Captain Hook and his first mate, Mr. Smee. Hook wants revenge on Peter for cutting off his hand, but fears the crocodile which consumed the hand, knowing it is eager to eat the rest of him. When Pan and the Darlings arrive, Hook shoots at them with a cannon, and Peter sends the Darlings off to safety while he baits the pirates. Tinker Bell, who is jealous of Pan's attention to Wendy, convinces the Lost Boys that Pan has ordered them to shoot down Wendy. Tinker Bell's treachery is soon found out, and Peter banishes her. John and Michael set off with the Lost Boys to find the island's Native Americans; however, the Natives capture the group, believing them to be responsible for taking the chief's daughter, Tiger Lily.

Meanwhile, Peter takes Wendy to see the mermaids, who flee in terror when Hook arrives on the scene. Peter and Wendy see that Hook and Smee have captured Tiger Lily, to force her to disclose Peter's hideout. Peter frees Tiger Lily and returns her to the Chief, and the tribe honors Peter. Meanwhile, Hook takes advantage of Tinker Bell's jealousy of Wendy, tricking the fairy into revealing Peter's secret hideout.

Wendy and her brothers eventually grow homesick and plan to return to London. They invite Peter and the Lost Boys to join them and be adopted by the Darlings. The Lost Boys agree, but Peter does not want to grow up and refuses. The pirates lie in wait, and capture the Lost Boys and the Darlings as they exit the lair, leaving behind a time bomb to kill Peter. Tinker Bell learns of the plot, just in time to snatch the bomb from Peter as it explodes.

Peter rescues Tinker Bell from the rubble, and together they rescue Wendy, confronting the pirates, and releasing the children before they can walk the plank. Peter engages Hook in combat as the children fight off the crew, and defeats him. Hook falls into the sea and swims away, pursued by the crocodile. Peter commandeers the deserted ship and, assisted by Tinker Bell's pixie dust, flies it to London with the children aboard.

George and Mary Darling return home from the party, and find Wendy sleeping at the nursery's open window. Wendy awakens and excitedly tells about their adventures. The parents look out the window and see what appears to be a pirate ship in the clouds. George, who has softened his position about Wendy staying in the nursery, recognizes the ship from his own childhood.

Cast

 Bobby Driscoll as Peter Pan, a cocky and adventurous inhabitant of Neverland who never grows up. He is frequently accompanied by his best-friend, the hot-headed pixie Tinker Bell. Walt Disney originally wanted Mary Martin, who was appearing in a stage production of the original play, to voice the character, while Jean Arthur also contacted him about being considered. Driscoll, who was Disney's first contract child actor and had previously starred in such films as Song of the South (1946), So Dear to My Heart (1948), and Treasure Island (1950), was ultimately chosen for the role. This was the first time when a male actor was cast as Peter Pan, breaking a tradition of women portraying him in both films and stage productions. Driscoll also provided some of the live-action reference for the character. Peter Pan was Driscoll's last Disney film, as his contract with the studio was abruptly terminated shortly after its release.
 Kathryn Beaumont as Wendy Darling, the eldest and most mature of the Darling children, who loves to tell the stories about Peter Pan and his adventures. For the part, Disney wanted a "gentle and gracefully feminine" voice, which he found in Beaumont, who had previously voiced the titular character in Alice in Wonderland (1951) and had just finished working on the film.
 Hans Conried as Captain Hook, a ruthless and obsessive pirate captain who seeks revenge on Peter for having his left hand chopped off and fed to the Crocodile in a battle. Disney initially offered the role to Cary Grant, which the latter was "intrigued with", but eventually Conried was cast, who also served as a character's model for the animators. In keeping the tradition of the stage play, Conried also voiced George Darling, the Darling children's strict, but loving father.
 Bill Thompson as Mr. Smee, Hook's first mate, personal assistant, and comic relief. His fellow crewmen (also voiced by Thompson) tease him into trying to convince Hook to give up the search for Peter Pan.
 Heather Angel as Mary Darling, the Darling children's sage and kind mother. She is much calmer and more understanding of her daughter's stories than her husband, even though she takes them with a pinch of salt.
 Paul Collins as John Darling, at age 8 the older of the two Darling boys. He acts very sophisticated and maturely for his age and is an analytical thinker and skilled strategist. He wears large, black glasses and is tall and slim. All the Darling children wear their nightgowns to Never Land, but he also takes a black top hat and an umbrella with him, showing exaggerated maturity.
 Tommy Luske as Michael Darling, at age 4 the youngest and most sensitive, clumsy, and playful of the three Darling children. He carries a teddy bear with him to Never Land.
 The Lost Boys: Pan's right-hand boys, dressed as various animals. Their names are Slightly (fox costume; voiced by Stuffy Singer), Cubby (bear costume; voiced by Robert Ellis), Nibs (rabbit costume; voiced by Jeffrey Silver), Tootles (skunk costume; never speaks) and the Twins (raccoon costumes; voiced by Johnny McGovern). Their origin remains a mystery, though they claim to have once had mothers of their own. They are very savage boys who get into fights easily with each other, but when they have a common goal to attain, they act as one. Tony Butala provides their singing voices.
 June Foray, Connie Hilton, Karen Kester, and Margaret Kerry as the mermaids, Peter's friends who are very interested in his heroic stories of himself. They are resentful of Wendy and easily frightened by Captain Hook. The mermaids appear to be in their mid-teens, with very womanly exposed bodies, resembling women in two-part bathing suits.
 Foray also voiced the Native American Squaw, who orders Wendy to get firewood while everyone else celebrates Peter Pan's honor from the tribe. 
 Tiger Lily is the Native American Chief's daughter, who, like most women on the island, is attracted to Peter. She does not speak save to call for help, and her voice is uncredited.
 Candy Candido as the fierce-looking but well-meaning Chief of the Native Americans. He and his people have fought the Lost Boys on many previous occasions with mixed victories.
 Tom Conway as the narrator, whose voice is heard only at the beginning of the film.
 The Mellomen (Thurl Ravenscroft, Bill Lee, Bob Stevens and Max Smith) as the pirate and Native American choruses.

Production

Early development
In 1935, Walt Disney first expressed interest in adapting J. M. Barrie's play Peter Pan as his second animated feature after Snow White and the Seven Dwarfs (1937). In April 1937, his brother Roy O. Disney visited the Great Ormond Street Hospital for Sick Children in London, who was the copyright owner, to acquire the rights to the play. However, the rights had already been acquired by Paramount Pictures, to which the hospital unsuccessfully offered to have the studios make an agreement with each other. In October 1938, Disney purchased the rights from Paramount, and in January 1939, Disney signed a contract with the hospital. By early 1939, a Leica reel had been completed. By May of that same year, Disney had several animators in mind for the characters: Vladimir Tytla was considered for the pirates, Norman Ferguson for the dog, Nana (who had also animated Pluto) and Fred Moore for Tinker Bell.

During this time, Disney explored many possible interpretations of the story. In the earliest version, the film would start by telling Peter Pan's backstory. During a story meeting on May 20, 1940, Disney said, "We ought to get right into the story itself, where Peter Pan comes to the house to get his shadow. That's where the story picks up. How Peter came to be is really another story." Disney also explored the idea of opening the film in Never Land with Peter Pan coming to Wendy's house to kidnap her as a mother for the Lost Boys. Eventually, Disney decided that the kidnapping plot was too dark, and he went back to Barrie's original play, in which Peter comes to get his shadow and Wendy is eager to see Never Land.

That same year, Disney personally attempted to contact Maude Adams, who had retired and was teaching drama at Stephens College. Adams had previously portrayed Peter Pan during a touring production of the play, which Disney had seen at the Cater Opera House in Marceline, Missouri in 1913. He notified her of his plans for an animated feature, and requested for her to view an early reel of the film that his studio had produced for her approval. He further affirmed that his studio would send the necessary screening equipment to Columbia College for the presentation and that it could be open to any Stephens College student or faculty member interested in attending.

However, Disney was upset when Adams had rejected his proposal. In a 1941 studio memo to Kay Kamen, Disney wrote: "She wouldn't give me the courtesy of looking at our reel. Her reasons were to the effect that 'Peter whom she created was to her real life and blood, while another's creation of this character would only be a ghost to her'. It seems pretty silly and from my point of view, I would say that Miss Adams is simply living in the past."

Production delays
Following the bombing of Pearl Harbor on December 7, 1941, the United States military took control of the studio and commissioned Walt Disney Productions to produce training and war propaganda films, thus pre-production work on Peter Pan and Alice in Wonderland (1951) was shelved. Aside from The Wind in the Willows (1949), the Bank of America allowed for production on Peter Pan to continue during World War II. After the war had ended, pre-production of the film resumed with Jack Kinney as director. At the time, Kinney had considered leaving Walt Disney Productions for the Metro-Goldwyn-Mayer cartoon studio, but wartime restrictions prevented it. Because he did not want Kinney to get out of his contract, Disney appointed Kinney to direct Peter Pan.

Impatient with the delays, Disney asked Kinney to work on sequences consecutively rather than finishing the entire script before it was storyboarded, so that a scene would be approved at a morning story meeting and then immediately put into development. Six months later, during a storyboard meeting, Kinney presented a two-and-a-half-hour presentation, during which Disney sat silently and then stated, "You know, I've been thinking about Cinderella."

Return to actual production
By 1947, Walt Disney Productions' financial health started to improve again. Around this time, Disney acknowledged the need for sound economic policies, but emphasized to his financial backers that slashing production would be suicidal to the studio. In order to restore the studio to profitability, Disney expressed his desire to return to producing full-length animated films. By then, three animated projects—Cinderella, Alice in Wonderland, and Peter Pan—were in development. Disney had felt the characters in Alice in Wonderland and Peter Pan were too cold, but because Cinderella (1950) contained similar elements when compared to Snow White and the Seven Dwarfs (1937), he decided to green-light Cinderella. In May 1949, Variety reported that Peter Pan had been placed back into production.

The scene in the nursery went through many alterations. In one version, it is Mrs. Darling who finds Peter Pan's shadow and shows it to Mr. Darling, as in the original play. In another version of the film, Nana goes to Never Land with Pan and the Darling children, the story being told through her eyes. In another interpretation of the story, John Darling is left behind for being too serious, practical and boring, but story artist Ralph Wright convinced Disney to have John go with the others to Never Land. This adaptation also included Wendy bringing her Peter Pan picture book and Peter and the children eating an "imaginary dinner". At one point, a party in Peter's hideout was conceived at which Tinker Bell becomes humiliated and, in her rage, tells Captain Hook the location of Peter Pan's hideout of her own free will. However, Disney felt that this story was contrary to Tinker Bell's character; instead, he had Captain Hook kidnapping Tinker Bell and persuading her to tell him. In Barrie's play, Captain Hook puts poison in Peter's dose of medicine and Tinker Bell saves Peter by drinking the poison herself, only to be revived by the applause of the theater audience. After much debate, Disney discarded this story development, fearing it would be difficult to achieve in a film.

In earlier scripts, there were more scenes involving the pirates and mermaids that were similar to those with the dwarfs in Snow White and the Seven Dwarfs. Ultimately, these scenes were cut for pacing reasons. The film concept was also a bit darker at one point than that of the finished product; for example, there were scenes involving Captain Hook being killed by the crocodile, the Darling family mourning over their lost children and Pan and the children discovering the pirates' treasure loaded with booby traps.

Animation

Live-action reference
As with previous Disney animated features since Snow White and the Seven Dwarfs (1937), a live-action version with the actors performing to a prerecorded dialogue track was filmed to serve as an aid to animators. Margaret Kerry received a call to audition to serve as the live-action reference for Tinker Bell. For the live-action reference, Kerry said she had to hold out her arms and pretend to fly for all the scenes requiring it. Additionally, Kerry served as reference for one of the mermaids, along with Connie Hilton and June Foray. 

At the same time, the studio was looking for an actor to portray Peter Pan, to which Kerry suggested her dancing teacher Roland Dupree. He was interviewed and eventually won the role, providing visual reference for the flying and action sequences. Bobby Driscoll also served as the live-action reference model for Peter Pan, although he was mainly used for the close-up scenes. Kathryn Beaumont, who was the voice of Wendy, performed the live-action reference footage for the character.

Hans Conried completed the voice work over the course of a few days, but served as the live-action reference for two and a half years.

Character animation
Milt Kahl wanted to animate Captain Hook but was instead assigned to animate Peter Pan and the Darling children; he claimed he was "outmaneuvered". During production, while animating Peter Pan, Kahl claimed that the hardest thing to animate was a character floating in mid-air. While observing the animation of Peter Pan, Disney complained that the animators had let too many of Bobby Driscoll's facial features find their way into the character design, telling Kahl that "[t]hey are too masculine, too old. There is something wrong there." Kahl replied, "You want to know what's wrong!?... What's wrong is that they don't have any talent in the place."

The job of animating Captain Hook was assigned to Frank Thomas, who faced conflicting visions of the character. Story artist Ed Penner viewed Hook as "a very foppish, not strong, dandy-type, who loved all the finery. Kind of a con man. [Co-director Gerry] Geronimi saw him as an Ernest Torrence: a mean, heavy sort of character who used his hook menacingly." When Disney saw Thomas' first test scenes, he said, "Well, that last scene has something I like I think you're beginning to get him. I think we better wait and let Frank go on a little further." Because Thomas could not animate every scene of Hook, certain sequences were given to Wolfgang Reitherman, such as Hook trying to escape Tick-Tock the crocodile at Skull Rock.

Ollie Johnston animated Mr. Smee. To best capture his comedic yet fear-ridden, sycophantic personality, Johnston used a variation of the Dwarf design from Snow White, and had Mr. Smee blink repeatedly. Johnston's former mentor, Fred Moore, worked in his unit as a character animator for Smee's minor scenes. Moore also animated the mermaids and the Lost Boys. On November 22, 1952, Moore and his wife were involved in an auto accident on Mount Gleason Drive in Los Angeles. Moore died of a cerebral concussion the following day at St. Joseph's Hospital, across from the Disney studios.

Music
Frank Churchill wrote several songs for the film during the early 1940s, and Charles Walcott wrote additional songs in 1941. When work on Peter Pan resumed in 1944, Eliot Daniel composed songs for the film. However, this version of Peter Pan was shelved so the studio could complete Cinderella. In April 1950, it was reported that Sammy Cahn and Sammy Fain were composing songs for Peter Pan. 
The incidental music score for the movie is composed by Oliver Wallace.

Songs

The melody for "The Second Star to the Right" was originally written for Alice in Wonderland as part of a song to be entitled "Beyond the Laughing Sky". Some Disneyland-issued compilations give the title as "Second Star to the Right" (no "The"); see, for example, 50 Happy Years of Disney Favorites (Disneyland Records, STER-3513, Side II). "What Made the Red Man Red?" became controversial because of its stereotypical portrayal of Native Americans. "Never Smile at a Crocodile" was cut from the movie soundtrack, but was included for the 1997 Walt Disney Records CD release. The song, with lyrics, also appears in the Sing-Along Songs video series and the corresponding Canta Con Nosotros title, where it is titled "Al reptil no hay que sonreír."

Original songs performed in the film include:

Music releases
 The 1997 soundtrack release contains the bonus tracks "Never Smile at a Crocodile" (with lyrics) and an early demo recording of "The Boatswain's Song."

Release

Original theatrical run and re-releases
Peter Pan was first released in theaters on February 5, 1953. During the film's initial theatrical run, Peter Pan was released as a double feature with the True-Life Adventures documentary short, Bear Country. It was then re-released theatrically in 1958, 1969, 1976, 1982 and 1989. The film also had a special limited re-release at the Philadelphia Film Festival in 2003. It also played a limited engagement in select Cinemark Theatres from February 16–18, 2013.

Home media
Peter Pan was first released on North American VHS, LaserDisc and Betamax in 1990 and UK VHS in 1993. A THX 45th anniversary limited edition of the film was released on March 3, 1998, as part of the Walt Disney Masterpiece Collection. Peter Pan was released on DVD on November 23, 1999 as a part of the Walt Disney Limited Issues series for a limited 60-day time period before going into moratorium. Peter Pan was re-released as a special-edition VHS and DVD release in 2002 to promote the sequel Return to Never Land. The DVD was accompanied with special features including a making-of documentary, a sing-along, a storybook and a still-frame gallery of production artwork.

Disney released a two-disc "Platinum Edition" DVD of the film on March 6, 2007. A Blu-ray "Diamond Edition" was released on February 5, 2013 to celebrate the movie's 60th anniversary. A DVD and digital copy of the "Diamond Edition" was also released on August 20, 2013. Peter Pan was re-released in digital HD format on May 29, 2018 and on Blu-ray on June 5, 2018, as part of the Walt Disney Signature Collection line, to celebrate the film's 65th anniversary.

Reception

Box office
During its initial theatrical run, Peter Pan grossed $6 million in distributor rentals from the United States and Canada and $2.6 million internationally. The movie has earned a lifetime domestic gross of $87.4 million. Adjusted for inflation, and incorporating subsequent releases, the film has had a lifetime gross of $427.5 million.

Critical reaction
Bosley Crowther of The New York Times criticized the film's lack of faithfulness to the original play, claiming it "has the story but not the spirit of Peter Pan as it was plainly conceived by its author and is usually played on the stage." Nevertheless, he praised the colors are "more exciting and the technical features of the job, such as the synchronization of voices with the animation of lips, are very good." However, Time magazine gave the film a highly favorable review, writing "it is a lively feature-length Technicolor excursion into a world that glows with an exhilarating charm and a gentle joyousness." Mae Tinee of The Chicago Tribune wrote: "The backgrounds are delightfully picturesque, the music only so-so. The film is designed for broad effect, with the accent of comedy. I'm sure the youngsters who grow up with cartoons will be right at home with all the characters." Variety described the film as a "feature cartoon of enchanting quality. The music score is fine, highlighting the constant buzz of action and comedy, but the songs are less impressive than usually encountered in such a Disney presentation." Harrison's Reports felt the film was "another Walt Disney masterpiece. It should prove a delight, not only to children, but also to every adult. The animation is so good that the characters appear almost natural."

Giving the film  stars out of 4, Gene Siskel of the Chicago Tribune noted the "drawing of Tinkerbelle [sic] and the flamboyance of Captain Hook" as well as the "quality music mixed with appropriate animation" were the film's major highlights. Michael Jackson cited Peter Pan as his favorite film, and from it he derived the name of his estate, Neverland Ranch, in Santa Barbara, California, where he had a private amusement park. Ronald D. Moore, one of the executive producers of the re-imagined Battlestar Galactica, has cited this film as the inspiration for the series' theme of the cyclical nature of time, using the film's opening line, "All of this has happened before and it will all happen again," as a key tenet of the culture's scripture. The website's critical consensus reads, "Though it doesn't delve deeply into the darkness of J.M. Barrie's tale, Peter Pan is a heartwarming, exuberant film with some great tunes."

Controversy
Peter Pan has been criticized in recent decades for its broadly stereotypical treatment of the Native Americans. In the song "What Made the Red Man Red?", the Native Americans are called "Injuns" and their skin color is attributed to the supposed first Native American prince blushing after being kissed by a woman. Marc Davis, one of the supervising animators of the film, said in an interview years after the production that "I'm not sure we would have done the Indians if we were making this movie now. And if we had we wouldn't do them the way we did back then." The Native Americans were not included in the 2002 sequel Return to Never Land, but they were included in a tie-in video game and are referenced by a brief shot of Peter Pan flying by a totem pole. In 2021, the film was one of several that Disney limited to viewers 7 years and older on their streaming service Disney+, citing depictions of Native American characters that were "stereotypical" and not "authentic", and references to them as "redskins".

Legacy

Disney Fairies

Disney Fairies is a series of children's books published by Random House, which features Tinker Bell and her friends. It also has a film series starting in 2008 with the self-titled film about Tinker Bell.

Theme parks

Peter Pan’s Flight is a popular ride found at Disneyland, Walt Disney World, Tokyo Disneyland, Disneyland Paris, and Shanghai Disneyland. Peter Pan, Wendy, Captain Hook and Mr. Smee make appearances in the parades, as well as greetings throughout the theme parks.
 Peter Pan, Wendy, Captain Hook, Mr. Smee, and the Pirates were featured in a scene during Disneyland's original version of Fantasmic! from 1992–2016.

Ice shows
 Disney on Ice began its touring production of Peter Pan in Fall 1989. The production went on to tour nationally & internationally, from 1989 – 1993. The production featured a pre-recorded soundtrack with all the film's songs and character voices.
 A shortened version of the story is presented in the current Disney on Ice production Mickey & Minnie's Amazing Journey. The show began in Fall 2003 & is currently on tour nationally. It features the songs "You Can Fly!", "Following the Leader", "Your Mother and Mine", "A Pirate's Life", "The Elegant Captain Hook" & "The Second Star to the Right".

Video games
Peter Pan: Adventures in Never Land is an adventure game in which Peter Pan and Tinker Bell are after a hidden treasure, before Captain Hook reach the treasure first.

Neverland is a playable world in both Kingdom Hearts and Kingdom Hearts: Chain of Memories, with Tinker Bell appearing as a summon. Both Peter Pan and Tinker Bell appear as a summon in the sequel, Kingdom Hearts II. Neverland also appears as a playable world in Kingdom Hearts 358/2 Days and returns as a playable world in Kingdom Hearts Birth by Sleep.

Peter Pan, Tinker Bell, Wendy, John, Michael and Captain Hook are playable characters in Disney Magic Kingdoms, being unlocked during the progress of the main storyline of the game.

Board game
Walt Disney's Peter Pan: A Game of Adventure (1953) is a Transogram Company Inc. track board game based upon the film. The game was one of many toys that exploited the popularity of Walt Disney's post-World War II movies. The object of the game is to be the first player to travel from the Darlings' house to Neverland and back to the Darlings' house.

Play begins at the Darlings' house in the upper left hand corner of the game board. Each player moves, in turn, the number of spaces along the track indicated by his spin of the dial. When a player reaches the Never Isle, he selects a character from the film (Peter, Wendy, Michael, or John) and receives the instruction card for that character. The player follows his chosen character's track on the board, obeying instructions upon the character's card. The player is also obligated to follow any instructions on those spaces he lands upon after spinning the dial during the course of his turn at play. The first player who travels from Never Land to Skull Rock and along the Stardust Trail to Captain Hook's ship, and returns to the Darlings' house is declared the winner.

The board game makes an appearance in the 1968 version of Yours, Mine and Ours as a Christmas present.

Musical
Disney's Peter Pan Jr is a one-hour children's musical based on the Disney Peter Pan movie with some updated material. It became available for school and children's theatre productions in 2013 after several pilot productions.

Sequels
This was Disney's first Peter Pan film. In the early 2000s, a Peter Pan franchise was spawned, involving a number of other animated releases. The franchise also included:
 Peter Pan: Return to Never Land: Released theatrically in 2002, and a direct-sequel to Peter Pan.
 The Tinker Bell film series: A spin-off and prequel to the Peter Pan films. Disneytoon Studios produced a number of Tinker Bell films, including six feature-length straight-to-home video films, and two shorts.
 The television series Jake and the Never Land Pirates includes Hook and Smee as main characters, and is set in Never Land, some time after the events of Peter Pan. Tick-Tock the Crocodile appears as a recurring character in the series. Peter, Tinker Bell, Wendy, Michael and John also appear as guest characters.

Live-action adaptation

In April 2016, following the individual financial and critical successes of Maleficent, Cinderella, and The Jungle Book,  a number of live-action adaptations of Walt Disney Pictures' classic animated films were announced to be in development. The Walt Disney Company announced that a live action Peter Pan film was in development, with David Lowery serving as director, with a script he co-wrote with Toby Halbrooks. In July 2018, it was reported that the feature length film would be released exclusively on the company's streaming service, Disney+. It has since been said that the film may instead get a theatrical release.

In January 2020, casting was underway while the film was retitled Peter Pan and Wendy. Joe Roth and Jim Whitaker will serve as producers. Principal photography was scheduled to commence on April 17, 2020, in Canada and in London, United Kingdom. By March, Alexander Molony and Ever Anderson were cast as Peter Pan and Wendy, respectively. Later that month however, filming on all Disney projects were halted due to the COVID-19 pandemic and industry restrictions worldwide. In July 2020, Jude Law entered early negotiations to portray Captain Hook, and was officially cast two months later. Joaquin Phoenix, Adam Driver, and Will Smith were all previously on the short-list of actors being considered for the role, though each of them ultimately passed on the opportunity. In September 2020, Yara Shahidi was cast as Tinker Bell. In October 2020, Alyssa Wapanatâhk was cast in the role of Tiger Lily. In January 2021, Jim Gaffigan joined the film's cast as Mr. Smee. On March 16, 2021, the same day that principal photography officially began, Alan Tudyk, Molly Parker, Joshua Pickering, and Jacobi Jupe were announced to play Mr. Darling, Mrs. Darling, John Darling, and Michael Darling, respectively.

In December 2020, it was announced that the film would be debuting on Disney+. Filming began on March 16, 2021 in Vancouver, Canada, and was expected to wrap on June 30, 2021. Additional filming took place on the Bonavista Peninsula of Newfoundland and Labrador, in August 2021. Peter Pan & Wendy is scheduled to be released on Disney+ on April 28, 2023.

See also

 List of animated feature films

References

Bibliography

External links

 
 
 
 
 Beaumont and Kerry: Peter Pan’s Leading Ladies Animated News & Views interviews
 Peter Pan on Lux Radio Theater: December 21, 1953. Starring Bobby Driscoll and Kathryn Beaumont.
 

1953 animated films
1953 films
1950s American animated films
1950s fantasy adventure films
American children's animated adventure films
American children's animated fantasy films
American fantasy adventure films
American animated feature films
Animated films about crocodilians
Animated films based on children's books
1950s children's fantasy films
Peter Pan (franchise)
1950s English-language films
Films about child abduction
Films about fairies and sprites
Films based on multiple works
American films based on plays
Animated films based on novels
Films adapted into television shows
Films based on British novels
Films based on fantasy novels
Films directed by Clyde Geronimi
Films directed by Wilfred Jackson
Films directed by Hamilton Luske
Films produced by Walt Disney
Films set in the 1900s
Animated films set in London
Films about mermaids
Films about Native Americans
Peter Pan films
Rotoscoped films
Walt Disney Animation Studios films
Walt Disney Pictures animated films
Films scored by Oliver Wallace
Disney controversies
Native American-related controversies in film
Race-related controversies in animation
Films with screenplays by Winston Hibler